The greater galagos or thick-tailed bushbabies are three species of strepsirrhine primates. They are classified in the genus Otolemur in the family Galagidae.

Historical classification and species discovery
The diversity of galago species has historically been grossly underestimated. In 1931, only 5 species were recognized, 4 in the genus Galago and 1 in Euoticus, and only one species that would later be placed in the genus Otolemur.  In 1979, the genus Otolemur was separated from Galago. By 1986, eleven species were recognized with revamped systemic classification including Otolemur crassicaudatus and Otolemur garnettii.  Additionally, O. crassidautus and O. monteiri were recognized as separate species instead of O. monteiri as a nested subspecies. By 2001, 23 species were recognized. Classification by vocalization has particularly become prevalent and helpful as a tool in understanding of these species. All Otolemur species exhibit trailing advertising calls.

Distribution and habitat
The species is found in and around coastal regions of Southern and Southeastern Africa; north from the Juba River in Somalia, southwards  through Kenya, Tanzania, Malawi, and Mozambique; west across Zimbabwe, Zambia, and Botswana; southwest to northern South Africa and as far west as Angola and Namibia. For the most part, they live in woodlands and forests, but also are found in sparsely wooded grasslands and even planted city parks and gardens.

Taxonomy
Genus Otolemur
 Brown greater galago, O. crassicaudatus
 O. c. crassicaudatus
 O. c. kirkii
 Silvery greater galago, O. monteiri
 O. m. monteiri
 O. m. argentatus
 Northern greater galago, O. garnettii
 O. g. garnettii
 O. g. lasiotis
 O. g. kikuyuensis
 O. g. panganiensis

References

External links

 Primate Info Net Otolemur Factsheets
 animalstaita.com

Galagos
Taxa named by Charles Coquerel
Taxa described in 1859